The men's 800 metres at the 1958 European Athletics Championships was held in Stockholm, Sweden, at Stockholms Olympiastadion on 19, 20, and 21 August 1958.

Medalists

Results

Final
21 August

Semi-finals
20 August

Semi-final 1

Semi-final 2

Heats
19 August

Heat 1

Heat 2

Heat 3

Heat 4

Participation
According to an unofficial count, 23 athletes from 16 countries participated in the event.

 (1)
 (1)
 (1)
 (2)
 (2)
 (2)
 (1)
 (1)
 (2)
 (1)
 (2)
 (1)
 (1)
 (1)
 (2)
 (2)

References

800 metres
800 metres at the European Athletics Championships